The Baram Dam, also known as Baram 1 Dam, (Baram Hydro-electric Dam Project) is a proposed gravity dam on the Baram River in Sarawak, Malaysia. The dam is part of the Sarawak Corridor of Renewable Energy and, if completed, would support a 1,200 MW power station. In November 2015, the Sarawak Chief Minister Tan Sri Adenan Satem announced that the Sarawak government had decided to shelf the Baram Dam because the people in Baram did not welcome the plan.

Design
The length of the dam at its crest will be .

Background
Baram 1 is one of 12 dams to be constructed in Sarawak and is being developed by Sarawak Energy. It is the next to be constructed after Murum Dam's reservoir impounded in 2013. Snowy Mountains Engineering Corporation is carrying out the design of the dam and 1,200 MW power station. In 2010, Fitchner completed a feasibility study on the dam and power station. In November 2012, the Social and Environmental Impact Assessment (SEIA) for the project began. On 11 July 2014, the Sarawak state government has unofficially approved the dam project although the SEIA report has not been completed. As of 17 December 2014, Sarawak Energy announced that it has yet to complete a comprehensive feasibility study and SEIA report due to ongoing protests against the Baram dam project.

Corruption has also been alleged, the Baram MP Jacob Dungau Sagan, currently the Malaysian Deputy Minister of International Trade and Industry, was accused of supporting the project after obtaining RM63 million worth of contracts and timber concessions for the Baram district. He dismissed it as a political ploy ahead of parliamentary elections.

Impacts

Displacement
At least 20,000 people from 25 longhouses would be displaced if the dam is built, according to International Rivers.  The feasibility study estimated that 6,000 to 8,000 people from 32 longhouses would be displaced. This number has also been verified by Miri Resident's office. The displaced communities mostly consisted of Kenyah, Kayan, and Penan communities. In the upcoming SEIA, a household register would be developed for proposed resettlement of the displaced communities. According to Sarawak Energy, the dam project would accelerate the development of Baram township and to provide work opportunities and better infrastructure development for the local communities.

With the threat of displacement, protests by locals and international anti-dam groups against the dam have been common and have stalled preliminary construction such as access-road building. In September 2012, a document containing thousands of signatures was submitted to Sarawak's Chief Minister office. However, also in 2012, the Federation of Orang Ulu Association Malaysia, a group representing local ethnic groups dwelling near the site, pledged their support to the project.

A group of 300 indigenous people staged a demonstration during IHA 2013 World Congress held by International Hydropower Association (IHA) at Borneo Convention Centre Kuching in May 2013. Written demands were submitted to executive director of IHA, Richard M Taylor. On 23 October 2013, native protesters disrupted 30 Sarawak Energy Berhad (SEB) workers who were doing geological studies at the proposed construction area.
Road blockades have impacted construction, one blockade has been erected near Long Lama and another one was erected near the proposed dam construction site. The blockade continued for nearly one year until 21 October 2014 when 50 police personnel dismantled the "KM15" blockade at Long Kesseh. Another blockade was re-erected few hours later. On 23 October 2014, the protesters celebrated one-year anniversary of the continuing blockade.

In November 2015, the late Sarawak Chief Minister Tan Sri Adenan Satem said that the Sarawak government had decided that the Baram Dam project had been shelved, though this is described as "temporary".

See also

 List of power stations in Malaysia
 Environmental impact of reservoirs

References

Hydroelectric power stations in Malaysia
Environmental issues in Malaysia
Dams in Sarawak
Cancelled hydroelectric power stations
Roller-compacted concrete dams
Dam controversies
Proposed renewable energy power stations in Malaysia